The   is the electric provider for the 4 prefectures of the Shikoku island in Japan with few exceptions.

On April 12, 1991 the company instituted Akari-chan as their image character and at the same time introduced the romanized nickname of Yonden (yon is another reading for 4, which occurs in Shikoku).

The company controls numerous 'ko-gaisha' (subsidiaries), such as an electronic parts maker, a cable media company, electric services pro diver and also an internet service provider called "Akari-net".  Those who sign a contract with Yonden may be eligible to get free internet access.  Yonden institutes automatic filtering of web content.

Generation

See also 

 Energy in Japan
 Nuclear power in Japan

Energy companies established in 1955
Nuclear power companies of Japan
Electric power companies of Japan
Japanese companies established in 1955